Northampton Plantation was an American plantation established by Thomas Sprigg in 1673.

Charles Calvert, 3rd Baron Baltimore granted a 1000-acre tract of land to Thomas Sprigg in 1673. The tract was called "Northampton," and Sprigg built his plantation there.  In 1865, John Contee Fairfax purchased the Northampton plantation, which continued as a working farm until the 1950s.

The site is now Northampton Plantation Slave Quarters & Archaeological Park in Bowie, Maryland. The park features the foundations of two former slave quarters that have been reconstructed as permanent outdoor museum exhibits in a park setting with interpretive signs. Group tours and school programs can be arranged by appointment.

References

External links
 Northampton Slave Quarters and Archaeological Park - Prince George's County Department of Parks and Recreation

Archaeological sites in Prince George's County, Maryland
Museums in Prince George's County, Maryland
Protected areas of Prince George's County, Maryland
Slave cabins and quarters in the United States
1673 establishments in Maryland
Sprigg family
Fairfax family residences